This is a list of gliders/sailplanes of the world, (this reference lists all gliders with references, where available) 
Note: Any aircraft can glide for a short time, but gliders are designed to glide for longer.

Y

Yakovlev
(Aleksander Yakovlev)
 Yakovlev AMF-10
 Yakovlev AMF-20
 Yakovlev Yak-14
 Yakovlev APS-10

Yakstas
( Adolfo Yakstas)
 Yakstas Halcón I
 Yakstas Halcón IIa
 Yakstas Halcón III

Yamasaki
(Yoshio Yamasaki / Itoh Hikoki Aviation)
 Iton D-1
 Itoh C-6

Yuneec International
(Yuneec International Ltd, Kunshan, Jiangsu, China)
Yuneec International EViva

Yalo S.C.
(Yalo S.C. from Nowy Dwór Mazowiecki)
 Yalo Moto-Bocian

Yeremeyev
( P. Yeremeyev)
 Yeremeyev Stalinets-4

Yildiz
(Ali Yildiz)
 Yildiz 1928 glider

Yokosuka
(Yokosuka Technical Arsenal aka Kyushu)
 Yokosuka MXY5
 Yokosuka MXY8 (glider version of Mitsubishi J8M)
 Yokosuka Shinryu

Yorkshire Sailplanes
 Yorkshire Sailplanes YS-53 Sovereign
 Yorkshire Sailplanes YS-55 Consort

Notes

Further reading

External links

Lists of glider aircraft